"Django" is a song by French singer Dadju featuring vocals from French rapper Franglish. It peaked at number 16 in the SNEP singles chart in France.

Charts

References

2018 songs
2018 singles
French-language songs
Dadju songs